The Iron lady is another series produced by ntv7 and Double Vision. The series began its run on 17 March 2009 at 10:00 pm on ntv7.

Synopsis
In earlier times and not very long ago, girls born to traditional Chinese families were deprived of privileges and opportunities reserved for males. Most of them accepted their fate dutifully and submissively.

But one woman of those oppressed times dared defy the hand she was dealt. Opportunist, manipulator, ambitious, she desired power to control her own destiny above all else.
This is the story of an unconventional woman of extraordinary will and determination who seized control of her fate at all costs!

Cast

The Gao Family

Other casts

Awards and nominations
Golden Awards 2010
 Won: Best Drama
 Won: Most Popular Drama
 Won: Best Actress (Yeo Yann Yann)
 Nominated: Most Popular Actress (Yeo Yann Yann)
 Won: Best Supporting Actress (Sck Fook Yee)
 Won: Best Drama Theme Song

External links
Challenging Destiny-STAR

Chinese-language drama television series in Malaysia
2009 Malaysian television series debuts
2009 Malaysian television series endings
NTV7 original programming